Paul Russell Cutright (March 18, 1897 – March 11, 1988) was an American historian, biologist, and professor, who was especially known for his work on the Lewis and Clark Expedition history and scientific achievements.

Bibliography

 Theodore Roosevelt, the naturalist, by Paul Russell Cutright, Harper (1956), 297 pages
 Elliott Coues: NATURALIST AND FRONTIER HISTORIAN by Michael J. Brodhead and Paul Russell Cutright, University of Illinois Press (2001), 536 pages
 Theodore Roosevelt: The Making of a Conservationist, by Paul Russell Cutright, University of Illinois Press (1985), 285 pages
 The Great Naturalists Explore South America, by Paul Russell Cutright
 Lewis and Clark: Pioneering Naturalists, by Paul Russell Cutright
 Meriwether Lewis: Naturalist, by Paul Russell Cutright
 A History of the Lewis and Clark Journals, by Paul Russell Cutright

References

1897 births
1988 deaths
American military historians
American male non-fiction writers
20th-century American historians
Historians of the American West
Historians of the United States
University of Pittsburgh alumni
Geneva College faculty
20th-century American male writers
Davis & Elkins College alumni
Biologists from West Virginia
Historians from West Virginia